Ratno Górne  is a village in the administrative district of Gmina Radków, within Kłodzko County, Lower Silesian Voivodeship, in south-western Poland.

References

Villages in Kłodzko County